Stamatis Sapalidis (born 5 July 1990) is a Greek professional footballer as striker or left winger.

Career
Born in Athens, Sapalidis began playing football with Peramaikos. At 16 January 2016,Sapalidis was released by PAS Giannina. He agreed to continue his career in Kissamikos.

References

1990 births
Living people
Association football forwards
Super League Greece players
PAS Giannina F.C. players
Footballers from Athens
Greek footballers